Camas is a census-designated place (CDP) in Sanders County, Montana, United States. The population was 58 at the 2010 census.

Demographics

References

Census-designated places in Sanders County, Montana
Census-designated places in Montana